György Hölvényi (born 13 June 1962) is a Hungarian politician currently serving as a Member of the European Parliament for the Christian Democratic People's Party. He previously served as the Secretary of State for Human Resources (directly below the responsible minister) from 9 July 2012 to 5 June 2014.

See also
 List of members of the European Parliament for Hungary, 2019–2024

References

Living people
MEPs for Hungary 2019–2024
Christian Democratic People's Party (Hungary) MEPs
Christian Democratic People's Party (Hungary) politicians
1962 births